AFL PNG is the peak promotional body for the sport of Australian rules football in Papua New Guinea.

AFL PNG organises the national championships tournament and selects the national team, the Mosquitos.

The governing body is the PNG Rules Football Council.

An affiliation is currently in place with AFL Queensland, with scholarships for players and representative side competing in Queensland competitions.

See also

Australian rules football in Papua New Guinea
List of Australian rules football leagues outside Australia

References

External links

Papua New Guinea
Australian rules football in Papua New Guinea
Sports organizations established in 2001
Australian rules football competitions in Oceania